Tjensvoll is a neighborhood (delområde) in the city of Stavanger which lies in the southwestern part of the large municipality of Stavanger in Rogaland county, Norway. It is located in the borough of Hillevåg, southwest of the lake Mosvatnet. Until 1987, it was a borough of its own. Tjensvoll Church is located in this neighborhood.

References

Boroughs and neighbourhoods of Stavanger